International School of Berne (ISBerne) is an international school in Gümligen, Muri bei Bern, Switzerland. Founded in 1961, It serves primarily international students aged 3 to 18. and offers 2 diploma options. The curriculum is the International Baccalaureate and is taught in English. Two official Swiss languages, German and French, are taught as additional languages.

In August 2015, the groundbreaking for its new campus occurred. In April 2017, the school moved to the new campus.

ISBerne is a member of the Swiss Group of International Schools (SGIS).

Accreditation

The International School of Berne was first accredited in 1984 by the Council of International Schools (CIS) and the New England Association of Schools and Colleges (NEASC) and was re-accredited in 1994, 2004 and 2015. ISBerne is currently in the reaccreditation process, having completed the CIS/NEASC Preparatory Visit virtually in February 2021.

As a private International School following only the English-taught International Baccalaureate programmes, ISBerne's secondary education program, which includes both middle and high school, is neither approved as a Gymnasium by the Bureau for Gymnasial and Vocational Education, or MBA (Mittelschul- und Berufsbildungsamt ), the Administration for Education (Erziehungsdirektion), the canton of Bern, nor by the Swiss Federal State Secretariat for Education, Research and Innovation (SERI). However, the International Baccalaureate Diploma is recognised and accepted by Universities in Switzerland to some degrees only.

The NEASC accreditation also is the validating body of the ISBerne Diploma, a United States equivalent High School Diploma.

Notable alumni 

 Kim Jong-Un, Supreme Leader of North Korea since 2011
 Kim Jong-chul, eldest son of Supreme Leader of North Korea Kim Jong-il

References

External links 

 Swiss Group of International Schools
 IB World Schools
 Council of International Schools
 New England Association of Schools and Colleges

Schools in Bern
International schools in Switzerland
Secondary schools in Switzerland
Buildings and structures in the canton of Bern